The 1977–78 New York Rangers season was the franchise's 52nd season. The Rangers slipped to last in the Patrick but qualified for the playoffs by having one of the top twelve records in the league. The Rangers lost in the first round of the playoffs.

Offseason
The Rangers hired Jean-Guy Talbot as their new head coach. It would be his only season as head coach of the Rangers.

Regular season

Season standings

Schedule and results

|- align="center" bgcolor="#CCFFCC"
| 1 || 12 || Vancouver Canucks || 6–3 || 1–0–0
|- align="center" bgcolor="#FFBBBB"
| 2 || 15 || @ Montreal Canadiens || 5–0 || 1–1–0
|- align="center" bgcolor="#CCFFCC"
| 3 || 16 || New York Islanders || 4–2 || 2–1–0
|- align="center" bgcolor="white"
| 4 || 19 || Pittsburgh Penguins || 3–3 || 2–1–1
|- align="center" bgcolor="#FFBBBB"
| 5 || 22 || @ New York Islanders || 7–2 || 2–2–1
|- align="center" bgcolor="#FFBBBB"
| 6 || 23 || Montreal Canadiens || 6–2 || 2–3–1
|- align="center" bgcolor="#CCFFCC"
| 7 || 25 || @ Cleveland Barons || 5–0 || 3–3–1
|- align="center" bgcolor="#CCFFCC"
| 8 || 26 || St. Louis Blues || 6–2 || 4–3–1
|- align="center" bgcolor="#FFBBBB"
| 9 || 29 || @ Atlanta Flames || 4–3 || 4–4–1
|- align="center" bgcolor="#FFBBBB"
| 10 || 30 || Los Angeles Kings || 5–3 || 4–5–1
|-

|- align="center" bgcolor="#FFBBBB"
| 11 || 2 || @ Colorado Rockies || 6–2 || 4–6–1
|- align="center" bgcolor="#CCFFCC"
| 12 || 4 || @ Vancouver Canucks || 5–1 || 5–6–1
|- align="center" bgcolor="#FFBBBB"
| 13 || 5 || @ Los Angeles Kings || 3–1 || 5–7–1
|- align="center" bgcolor="#CCFFCC"
| 14 || 9 || Buffalo Sabres || 8–4 || 6–7–1
|- align="center" bgcolor="#FFBBBB"
| 15 || 12 || @ Detroit Red Wings || 3–1 || 6–8–1
|- align="center" bgcolor="#FFBBBB"
| 16 || 13 || Atlanta Flames || 5–2 || 6–9–1
|- align="center" bgcolor="#CCFFCC"
| 17 || 16 || Chicago Black Hawks || 5–2 || 7–9–1
|- align="center" bgcolor="white"
| 18 || 19 || @ Pittsburgh Penguins || 5–5 || 7–9–2
|- align="center" bgcolor="#FFBBBB"
| 19 || 20 || Vancouver Canucks || 3–0 || 7–10–2
|- align="center" bgcolor="#CCFFCC"
| 20 || 23 || Colorado Rockies || 6–3 || 8–10–2
|- align="center" bgcolor="#FFBBBB"
| 21 || 26 || @ Boston Bruins || 3–2 || 8–11–2
|- align="center" bgcolor="#FFBBBB"
| 22 || 27 || @ Buffalo Sabres || 3–2 || 8–12–2
|- align="center" bgcolor="#CCFFCC"
| 23 || 30 || @ St. Louis Blues || 4–0 || 9–12–2
|-

|- align="center" bgcolor="#CCFFCC"
| 24 || 3 || @ Minnesota North Stars || 4–0 || 10–12–2
|- align="center" bgcolor="white"
| 25 || 4 || Minnesota North Stars || 4–4 || 10–12–3
|- align="center" bgcolor="white"
| 26 || 7 || Philadelphia Flyers || 3–3 || 10–12–4
|- align="center" bgcolor="#FFBBBB"
| 27 || 8 || @ Philadelphia Flyers || 7–4 || 10–13–4
|- align="center" bgcolor="#FFBBBB"
| 28 || 11 || Boston Bruins || 8–2 || 10–14–4
|- align="center" bgcolor="white"
| 29 || 14 || @ Chicago Black Hawks || 2–2 || 10–14–5
|- align="center" bgcolor="white"
| 30 || 15 || @ Detroit Red Wings || 5–5 || 10–14–6
|- align="center" bgcolor="#FFBBBB"
| 31 || 17 || @ Cleveland Barons || 4–2 || 10–15–6
|- align="center" bgcolor="#CCFFCC"
| 32 || 18 || Detroit Red Wings || 6–2 || 11–15–6
|- align="center" bgcolor="white"
| 33 || 21 || Washington Capitals || 5–5 || 11–15–7
|- align="center" bgcolor="#CCFFCC"
| 34 || 23 || Cleveland Barons || 5–4 || 12–15–7
|- align="center" bgcolor="#FFBBBB"
| 35 || 28 || Philadelphia Flyers || 4–3 || 12–16–7
|- align="center" bgcolor="white"
| 36 || 30 || @ Washington Capitals || 3–3 || 12–16–8
|- align="center" bgcolor="white"
| 37 || 31 || Buffalo Sabres || 2–2 || 12–16–9
|-

|- align="center" bgcolor="#CCFFCC"
| 38 || 4 || @ Minnesota North Stars || 5–3 || 13–16–9
|- align="center" bgcolor="#FFBBBB"
| 39 || 7 || @ Colorado Rockies || 3–1 || 13–17–9
|- align="center" bgcolor="#FFBBBB"
| 40 || 9 || Pittsburgh Penguins || 5–3 || 13–18–9
|- align="center" bgcolor="#CCFFCC"
| 41 || 10 || @ Boston Bruins || 3–2 || 14–18–9
|- align="center" bgcolor="#FFBBBB"
| 42 || 14 || @ Philadelphia Flyers || 4–1 || 14–19–9
|- align="center" bgcolor="#CCFFCC"
| 43 || 17 || @ Vancouver Canucks || 5–4 || 15–19–9
|- align="center" bgcolor="#CCFFCC"
| 44 || 18 || @ Los Angeles Kings || 3–0 || 16–19–9
|- align="center" bgcolor="#FFBBBB"
| 45 || 20 || @ Atlanta Flames || 5–3 || 16–20–9
|- align="center" bgcolor="#FFBBBB"
| 46 || 22 || @ Pittsburgh Penguins || 3–1 || 16–21–9
|- align="center" bgcolor="#FFBBBB"
| 47 || 25 || Toronto Maple Leafs || 4–3 || 16–22–9
|- align="center" bgcolor="#FFBBBB"
| 48 || 28 || @ New York Islanders || 6–2 || 16–23–9
|- align="center" bgcolor="#FFBBBB"
| 49 || 29 || Los Angeles Kings || 4–1 || 16–24–9
|-

|- align="center" bgcolor="#FFBBBB"
| 50 || 1 || New York Islanders || 7–6 || 16–25–9
|- align="center" bgcolor="white"
| 51 || 4 || @ St. Louis Blues || 2–2 || 16–25–10
|- align="center" bgcolor="#CCFFCC"
| 52 || 5 || Colorado Rockies || 6–3 || 17–25–10
|- align="center" bgcolor="#CCFFCC"
| 53 || 8 || Minnesota North Stars || 3–0 || 18–25–10
|- align="center" bgcolor="#FFBBBB"
| 54 || 9 || @ Buffalo Sabres || 2–0 || 18–26–10
|- align="center" bgcolor="#FFBBBB"
| 55 || 11 || @ Toronto Maple Leafs || 3–2 || 18–27–10
|- align="center" bgcolor="#FFBBBB"
| 56 || 12 || Montreal Canadiens || 5–3 || 18–28–10
|- align="center" bgcolor="#CCFFCC"
| 57 || 15 || Vancouver Canucks || 6–3 || 19–28–10
|- align="center" bgcolor="white"
| 58 || 19 || Colorado Rockies || 4–4 || 19–28–11
|- align="center" bgcolor="#FFBBBB"
| 59 || 22 || @ Chicago Black Hawks || 3–2 || 19–29–11
|- align="center" bgcolor="#CCFFCC"
| 60 || 23 || Chicago Black Hawks || 6–2 || 20–29–11
|- align="center" bgcolor="#CCFFCC"
| 61 || 25 || @ Montreal Canadiens || 6–3 || 21–29–11
|- align="center" bgcolor="#FFBBBB"
| 62 || 27 || Atlanta Flames || 5–3 || 21–30–11
|-

|- align="center" bgcolor="#CCFFCC"
| 63 || 1 || Detroit Red Wings || 3–2 || 22–30–11
|- align="center" bgcolor="#FFBBBB"
| 64 || 5 || Toronto Maple Leafs || 4–1 || 22–31–11
|- align="center" bgcolor="#CCFFCC"
| 65 || 8 || Cleveland Barons || 6–1 || 23–31–11
|- align="center" bgcolor="#CCFFCC"
| 66 || 12 || Washington Capitals || 8–2 || 24–31–11
|- align="center" bgcolor="white"
| 67 || 15 || Philadelphia Flyers || 2–2 || 24–31–12
|- align="center" bgcolor="#FFBBBB"
| 68 || 18 || Boston Bruins || 6–3 || 24–32–12
|- align="center" bgcolor="white"
| 69 || 19 || @ Minnesota North Stars || 7–7 || 24–32–13
|- align="center" bgcolor="#CCFFCC"
| 70 || 22 || @ St. Louis Blues || 6–1 || 25–32–13
|- align="center" bgcolor="#CCFFCC"
| 71 || 24 || @ Washington Capitals || 11–4 || 26–32–13
|- align="center" bgcolor="#CCFFCC"
| 72 || 25 || @ Toronto Maple Leafs || 5–2 || 27–32–13
|- align="center" bgcolor="#CCFFCC"
| 73 || 27 || St. Louis Blues || 5–2 || 28–32–13
|- align="center" bgcolor="#CCFFCC"
| 74 || 29 || New York Islanders || 5–1 || 29–32–13
|-

|- align="center" bgcolor="#FFBBBB"
| 75 || 1 || @ Atlanta Flames || 6–0 || 29–33–13
|- align="center" bgcolor="#FFBBBB"
| 76 || 2 || @ Boston Bruins || 8–3 || 29–34–13
|- align="center" bgcolor="#FFBBBB"
| 77 || 5 || Atlanta Flames || 4–2 || 29–35–13
|- align="center" bgcolor="#FFBBBB"
| 78 || 6 || @ Philadelphia Flyers || 3–0 || 29–36–13
|- align="center" bgcolor="#FFBBBB"
| 79 || 8 || @ New York Islanders || 7–2 || 29–37–13
|- align="center" bgcolor="#CCFFCC"
| 80 || 9 || Chicago Black Hawks || 3–2 || 30–37–13
|-

Playoffs

Key:  Win  Loss

Player statistics
Skaters

Goaltenders

†Denotes player spent time with another team before joining Rangers. Stats reflect time with Rangers only.
‡Traded mid-season. Stats reflect time with Rangers only.

Awards and records
Phil Esposito, Lester Patrick Trophy

Transactions

Draft picks
New York's picks at the 1977 NHL amateur draft in Montreal, Quebec, Canada.

Farm teams

See also
 1977–78 NHL season

References

External links
 Rangers on Hockey Database

New York Rangers seasons
New York Rangers
New York Rangers
New York Rangers
New York Rangers
Madison Square Garden
1970s in Manhattan